The Outsiders may refer to:

Literature and stage 
 The Outsiders (novel), a 1967 novel by S. E. Hinton
 The Outsiders (play), a 1911 play by Charles Klein
 Outsiders (comics), a team of superheroes in the DC Universe
 The Outsiders, a fictional alien race created by Larry Niven; see Outsider (Known Space)

Music 
 The Outsiders (American band), a 1960s pop/rock group
 The Outsiders (British band), a 1970s punk band
 The Outsiders (Dutch band), a 1960s beat/rock group
 The Outsiders (Tampa band), a 1960s American garage rock band
 The Outsiders (Needtobreathe album), 2009
 "The Outsiders" (Needtobreathe song), 2009
 The Outsiders (Eric Church album), 2014
 "The Outsiders", a 2004 song by R.E.M. from Around the Sun
 "The Outsiders", a 2007 song by Athlete from Beyond the Neighbourhood
 "The Outsiders" (Eric Church song), 2014

Film 
 The Outsiders (film), a 1983 film based on S. E. Hinton's novel, directed by Francis Ford Coppola
 Bande à part (film) (English: Band of Outsiders or The Outsiders), a 1964 film directed by Jean-Luc Godard
 Los caifanes, a 1967 film directed by Juan Ibáñez, also released as The Outsiders
 The Outsiders (1958 film) (Mori to Mizuumi no Matsuri), a Japanese film directed by Tomu Uchida
 The Outsiders, a 1998 UK documentary, featuring Nick Hancock, about Iran in the World Cup
 Ceddo, a 1977 Senegalese film directed by Ousmane Sembène, also known as The Outsiders

Television 
 The Outsiders (U.S. TV series), a 1990 American series based on characters from S. E. Hinton's novel that aired for one season
 Outsiders (U.S. TV series), a 2016 American drama series (not related to  S. E. Hinton's novel and/or film adaption) that aired for two seasons
 The Outsiders (Australian TV series), a 1976 series starring Andrew Keir and Sascha Hehn
 Ha'Nephilim (English: The Outsiders), an Israeli drama and science fiction television show
 Primetime: The Outsiders, an American TV documentary news series
 The Outsiders (Taiwanese TV series), a 2004 Taiwanese TV drama
 The Outsider (miniseries), an American miniseries

Other uses 
 The Outsiders (professional wrestling), a professional wrestling tag team

See also 
 Neurotic Outsiders, a supergroup
 The Outsider (disambiguation)
 Outsider (disambiguation)
 Outsiders (disambiguation)